Hélène is a 1989 album by Canadian singer Roch Voisine. The title track "Hélène" is his best sold single ever, reaching number one for nine weeks on the French Singles Chart. Other successful singles from the album include "Pourtant" (#3) and "Avant de partir" (#7), released in 1990 summer.

Two songs were both written and composed by the singer himself. Marc Voisine, his brother, participated in the writing of the last track. The recording and mixing were made at the Victor studio, except for the song "Hélène" (at Intercession studio).

The album debuted at #14 on 3 December 1989 on the SNEP Albums Chart and had a peak at number one for two weeks almost eleven months after. It totaled 40 weeks in the top ten and 113 weeks in the top 50. In 1991, the album achieved Diamond status for over one million copies sold. In Norway, the album entered the albums chart in February 1990 and stayed for six weeks in the top 20, with a peak at number nine.

Track listing
 "Hélène" (Voisine, Lessard / Voisine) — 3:42
 "Là-bas dans l'ombre" (Voisine, Lefèvre / Katz) — 4:19
 "Pourtant" (Voisine, Lefèvre / Voisine) — 5:47
 "Avant de partir" (Décarie / Gauthier) — 3:08 
 "L'idole" (Voisine) — 4:11
 "Fille de pluie" (My Calgary Flirt) (Voisine, Huet / Voisine) — 3:37
 "Souviens-toi" (Voisine) — 4:53
 "Pour une victoire" (Voisine, Lefèvre / Voisine) — 2:53
 "Tous les soirs, c'est Saturday" (Voisine / Voisine, Price) — 3:33
 "Ton blues" (Voisine, Marc Voisine, Lefèvre / Sperenza) — 3:27

Personnel
 André Di Cesare – artistic direction
 Luc Gilbert - production, arrangements, keyboards, drum programming (track 1 - Hélène)
 Scott Price – arrangements (except tracks 1–3), synthesizers, piano, synthesizers programming
 Carl Katz – guitars (track 1 - Hélène)
 Michael Pucci, Robert (Bob) Stanley - guitars
 Sylvain Bolduc – bass
 Richard Provençal – drums
 Louise Lemire, Élise Duguay, Estelle Esse, Richard Groulx - backup vocals
 Andy Scott, Michel Delaney – engineers
 Jean Blais (front cover), Lyne Charlebois, Michel Tremblay (back cover) – photos
 Steeve Daviault – hair, make-up
 Bill Kinal, Josée Simard – assistants

References

External links
Roch Voisine Official site album page

1989 albums
Roch Voisine albums